Gabriel Pereira may refer to:

 Gabriel Pereira de Castro (1571–1632), Portuguese priest, lawyer and poet
 Gabriel Antonio Pereira (1794–1861), Uruguayan politician
 Gabriel Pereira (footballer, born 1997), Brazilian football forward (full name: Gabriel Pereira da Silva)
 Gabriel Pereira (footballer, born 2001), Brazilian football midfielder (full name: Gabriel Pereira dos Santos)

See also
 Gabriel Pereyra (born 1978), Argentine football coach and former player